ILR may refer to:

 Institute for Legal Reform, an advocacy group founded in 1998 by the United States Chamber of Commerce
 Cornell University School of Industrial and Labor Relations
 Industrial and Labor Relations Review (ILR Review), a publication of the Cornell University School of Industrial and Labor Relations
 Interagency Language Roundtable, an unfunded organization on foreign language activities in the United States Federal Government
 ILR scale, a measure of language proficiency originally created by the Interagency Language Roundtable
 Indefinite leave to remain, an immigration status in the United Kingdom
 Ivo Lola Ribar Institute, a Serbia-based manufacturer of heavy machine tools
 Independent Local Radio, a term for commercial radio in the United Kingdom and Ireland
 Institut Luxembourgeois de Régulation, a regulatory agency in Luxembourg
 Iowa Law Review, published by the University of Iowa College of Law
 Implantable loop recorder, a medical diagnostic device
 Interleukin receptor (IL-R), a cytokine receptor for interleukins
 Ignitable liquid residues, used in the detection of fire accelerants
 Individualised Learner Record, a data collection submitted by further education providers in England

See also 
 Indian Long Range Squadron (ILRS)